Nina Adams Harmer (born December 11, 1945), also known by her married name Nina Thompson, is an American former competition swimmer and Pan American Games gold medalist.

Harmer was born in Philadelphia, Pennsylvania, and trained with the Vesper Boat Club in Philadelphia.  As a 14-year-old, she represented the United States at the 1960 Summer Olympics in Rome.  She competed in the women's 100-meter backstroke, but did not advance beyond the preliminary heats.

At the 1963 Pan American Games in São Paulo, Brazil, she won the gold medal in the women's 100-meter backstroke.

A year later at the 1964 Summer Olympics in Tokyo, Japan, Harmer swam for the gold medal-winning U.S. team in the preliminary heats of the women's 4×100-meter medley relay.  She did not receive a medal under the 1964 international swimming rules because she did not swim in the relay event final.  Individually, she also competed in the women's 100-meter backstroke, finishing fifth in the event final with a time of 1:09.4, behind American teammates Cathy Ferguson (first), and Ginny Duenkel (third).

References

External links
 

1945 births
Living people
American female backstroke swimmers
Olympic swimmers of the United States
Swimmers from Philadelphia
Swimmers at the 1960 Summer Olympics
Swimmers at the 1963 Pan American Games
Swimmers at the 1964 Summer Olympics
Pan American Games gold medalists for the United States
Pan American Games medalists in swimming
Medalists at the 1963 Pan American Games
21st-century American women